Für ein einiges, glückliches Vaterland is an East German film. It was released in 1950.

External links
 

1950 films
German short films
East German films
1950s German-language films
1950s German films